Beit Guvrin-Maresha National Park is a national park in central Israel, containing a large network of caves recognized by UNESCO as a World Heritage Site. The national park includes the remains of the historical towns of Maresha, one of the important towns of Judah during the First Temple Period, and Bayt Jibrin, a depopulated Palestinian town known as Eleutheropolis in the Roman era. However, Maresha and Bayt Jibrin are not part of the UNESCO site, which covers only the cave network.

Archaeological artifacts unearthed at the site include a large Jewish cemetery, a Roman-Byzantine amphitheater, a Byzantine church, public baths, mosaics and burial caves.

It is located 13 kilometers from Kiryat Gat.

History

The earliest written record of Maresha was as a city in ancient Judah (Joshua 15:44). The Hebrew Bible mentions among other episodes that Rehoboam fortified it against Egyptian attack. After the destruction of the Kingdom of Judah the city of Maresha became part of the Edomite kingdom. In the late Persian period a Sidonian community settled in Maresha, and the city is mentioned in the Zenon Papyri (259 BC). During the Maccabean Revolt, Maresha was a base for attacks against Judea and suffered retaliation from the Maccabees. After Hasmonean king John Hyrcanus I captured and destroyed Maresha in 112 BCE, the region of Idumea remained under Hasmonean control. In 40 BC the Parthians devastated completely the "strong cite", after which it was never rebuilt. 
 
Beth Gabra or Beit Guvrin succeeded Maresha as the main town of the area. Conquered by the Roman general Vespasian during the Jewish War (68 CE) and completely destroyed during the Bar Kochba revolt (132–135 CE), it was re-established as a Roman colony and in the year 200 it received the title of a city and the ius italicum, under the new name of "Eleutheropolis", 'city of freemen'. Sources from the Byzantine period mention both Christian and Jewish personalities living in the city.

History of archaeological excavations

Maresha was first excavated in 1898–1900 by Bliss and Macalister, who uncovered a planned and fortified Hellenistic city encircled by a town wall with towers. Two Hellenistic and one Israelite stratum were identified by them on the mound. Many of the ancient city's olive presses, columbaria and water cisterns can still be seen.
 
Both Maresha and Beit Guvrin/Eleutheropolis were excavated after 1989 and 1992 respectively by the Israeli archaeologist Amos Kloner. Important finds at the latter site were the amphitheater built by the Roman army units stationed there, a large Roman bath house, and from the Crusader period a fortress integrating the walls of the Roman amphitheater and bath house, as well as an attached church.

Archaeological remains

Burial caves
The Sidonian burial caves were the family tomb of Apollophanes, the leader of the Sidonian community in Beit Guvrin. The Sidonian caves are the only ones that are painted inside. The caves were burial caves for the Greek, Sidonian and Edumite inhabitants of Beit Guvrin. The first and largest cave has paintings of animals, real and mythic, above the niches where the corpses were laid. A cock crows to scare away demons; the three-headed dog Cerberus guards the entrance to the underworld; a bright red phoenix symbolizes the life after death. The Tomb of the Musicians is decorated with a painting showing a  man playing the flute and a woman playing the harp.

Bell caves

There are about 800 bell-shaped caves located in the area. Many of the caves are linked via an underground network of passageways that connect groups of 40–50 caves.

The largest bell caves are in the east part of the park. They have been dug since prehistoric times, the excavations reaching their zenith in the Hellenistic period and during the Byzantine and Early Arab Period, when blocks of chalkstone extracted from the caves were used for construction work (buildings, etc.). The bell caves consist of limestone in their upper-layer (to a depth of about one to two meters), beneath which is rock consisting solely of a beige-colored, soft chalkstone, utilized by its early inhabits for carving caverns and dwellings. There are numerous bell caves within the park grounds and events are held in one of them.

Columbaria
The National Park is known for some of the best preserved columbaria from the Hellenistic and Roman periods. One of the largest is located on the west side of Tell Maresha (Khurbet es Sandahannah), described by Conder and Kitchener in their Survey of Western Palestine, and formerly known by its local inhabitants as Es Sûk. It has been carved underground from the soft chalkstone endemic to the area, and built with tiers of niches capable of housing hundreds of brooding pigeons.

Cave dwellings
There are a number of cave-like dwellings carved from the chalkstone bedrock, some of which display a vast extension of networks and passageways, with staircases descending down into the depth, made with step-like balustrades, and replete with cisterns for storing water and millstones for grinding olives. These caverns and dwellings, though not situated on the eminence of the Tell itself, were considered part and parcel with the city of Maresha itself, as they were later enclosed by a wall that encompassed both the city and its expanded suburbs.  The largest and most impressive of these caverns and dwelling places is that built near the Tell on its southeast side, and which the locals knew by the name Mŭghâret Sandahannah (The Cave of Saint Anne). Today, in Modern Hebrew, the same cave dwelling is called Mavokh (Maze).

The Church of Saint Anne

Saint Anne's church was first built in the Byzantine period and then rebuilt by the Crusaders in the 12th century. The ruin is known in Arabic as Khirbet (lit. "ruin") Sandahanna, the nearby tell (mound) of Maresha being called Tell Sandahanna. The freestanding remains of the apse are well preserved (see photo).

Amphitheater
The remains of a Roman amphitheater were uncovered in the mid-1990s. The amphitheater was built in the 2nd century, on the northwestern outskirts of Beit Guvrin. This amphitheater, in which gladiatorial contests took place, could seat about 3,500 spectators. It had a walled arena of packed earth, with subterranean galleries. The arena was surrounded by a series of connected barrel vaults, which formed a long, circular corridor and supported the stone seats above it; staircases led from the outside and from the circular corridor to the tribunes. It was built for the Roman troops stationed in the region after the suppression of the Bar Kochba rebellion. The amphitheater is an elliptical structure built of large rectangular limestone ashlars. It was in use until destroyed in the Galilee earthquake of 363.

Other finds
Byzantine mosaics depicting birds and animals were discovered on the hilltop in 1924.

Several hundred astragali – animal knucklebone dice – used 2,300 years ago during the Hellenistic period for divination and gaming have been found at the site since 2000.

Among other major archaeological finds at this site is the Heliodorus Stele (see: https://www.imj.org.il/en/exhibitions/heliodorus-stele). This stele recounts events in Judaea prior to the Maccabean revolt and offers important historical evidence for events which modern day Jews commemorate during the holiday of Chanukah.

See also
Bayt Jibrin for the history of the area
Eleutheropolis
Kibbutz Beit Guvrin
Maresha
National Parks of Israel

References

External links

Beit Guvrin
Israeli parks
UNESCO
 Israel places: Beit Guvrin
Archaeology of Beit Guvrin, Jewish Virtual Library
Gems in Israel
Unique sounds in the Bell Caves
 Shuli Levinboim, Re-reconstruction of the Bird Mosaic, Antiquities Site – Conservation Department

National parks of Israel
Protected areas of Southern District (Israel)
Buildings and structures in Southern District (Israel)
Ancient Jewish settlements of Judaea
Hellenistic sites
Archaeological sites in Israel
Roman towns and cities in Israel
2nd-century BC establishments in the Hasmonean Kingdom